National Route 249 is a national highway of Japan connecting Nanao, Ishikawa and Kanazawa, Ishikawa in Japan, with a total length of 248.8 km (154.6 mi). Much of the route is concurrent with Route 159.

References

National highways in Japan
Roads in Ishikawa Prefecture